Satvamangala Mangalye  is an Indian Kannada language drama on Star Suvarna which premiered on 30 July 2018 which stars Chandan Kumar and Aishwarya Pisse in the lead role. The show is the remake of StarPlus's Tu Sooraj Main Saanjh, Piyaji. Owing to the COVID-19 pandemic the show went off air on 3 April 2020.

Plot 
Shankara is a young man who falls in love and marries a strong-willed Parvathy. While Shankara has grown up in a conservative set up, Parvathy is an independent girl who speaks her mind and together, they brave the crises in their relationship.

Cast 
 Chandan Kumar as Maha Shankara; an ideal devotee of lord Shiva and Parvathy's husband
 Aishwarya Pisse  as Parvathy alias Paaru; Maha Shankara's wife
 Swathi as Bhairavi, Maha Shankara's aunt
 Rekha Rao as Durgadevi, Parvathy's Grandmother
 Rashmitha J Shetty as Ganga ; Bhairavi's daughter
 Nisha Ravikrishnan as Nitya, Mana Shankara's sister

Production 
The series was a comeback venture for Chandan Kumar to the small screen after a gap. The serial also marked the comeback of Aishwarya Pisse to Kannada after a gap of few years. The show was aired on 30 July 2018.The serial was shot in Mysuru for a few episodes

References 

2018 Indian television series debuts
Indian drama television series
Indian television soap operas
Kannada-language television shows
Star Suvarna original programming